Youri Marion A. Tielemans (born 7 May 1997) is a Belgian professional footballer who plays as a midfielder for  club Leicester City and the Belgium national team.

Tielemans began his career at Anderlecht, where he made 185 official appearances and scored 35 goals across four seasons. He won the league title twice and in 2017 was chosen as the Belgian Professional Footballer of the Year. He is the youngest Belgian to play in the UEFA Champions League, making his debut in the competition at the age of 16 years and 148 days. After two years at Monaco in Ligue 1, he joined Leicester in 2019, initially on loan and then for an estimated fee of £32 million. He scored the only goal of the 2021 FA Cup Final.

Tielemans represented Belgium at several youth levels and before gaining his first cap for the national team in November 2016, aged 19. He was part of the squad that came third at the 2018 FIFA World Cup, also featuring at UEFA Euro 2020 and the 2022 World Cup.

Club career

Anderlecht

Tielemans is a youth product of Anderlecht and signed his first professional contract with the club at the age of 16.

On 21 July 2013, he was included in the senior squad for the first time, remaining an unused substitute in the 1–0 win over Genk in the 2013 Belgian Super Cup. On 28 July 2013, he made his first-team debut in the opening round of the Belgian Pro League season against Lokeren, replacing injured Sacha Kljestan after 25 minutes of a 2–3 home loss. This made him the fourth-youngest player in the league's history.

On 2 October 2013, he became the youngest Belgian player to play in the UEFA Champions League, starting in a match against Olympiacos at the age of 16 years and 148 days. He played 29 games – of which 21 starts – as Anderlecht won the 2013–14 Belgian Pro League, scoring to open a 3–0 win over Club Brugge at the Constant Vanden Stock Stadium on 6 April 2014, a game in which he also assisted Cyriac. Tielemans won the Belgian Young Player of the Year award in each of his first two seasons.

Tielemans scored 13 times in 37 Belgian First Division A matches as Anderlecht won the 2016–17 Belgian First Division A. He won the 2017 Ebony Shoe Award for best player of African origin, and was named 2016–17 Belgian Professional Footballer of the Year. He scored 5 goals in 15 2016–17 UEFA Europa League matches, with his club reaching the quarter-finals, and was selected in its Squad of the Season.

Monaco
On 24 May 2017, Tielemans joined 2016–17 Ligue 1 champions Monaco on a five-year deal for a fee of around €25 million. He made his competitive debut on 29 July in the Trophée des Champions at the Grand Stade de Tanger, playing the full 90 minutes in the 2–1 loss to Paris Saint-Germain and assisting Djibril Sidibé's opening goal. On 4 August, Tielemans made his Ligue 1 debut in the 3–2 home win over Toulouse, coming on as a substitute for Radamel Falcao in the 87th minute. He made his UEFA club competition debut for Monaco on 13 September in the UEFA Champions League group match away to RB Leipzig, playing the full 90 minutes and registering his first competitive goal for Monaco by equalizing in a 1–1 draw. On 16 September, Tielemans made his first Ligue 1 start and played the entire match in the 3–0 home win over Strasbourg, after having played a total of 56 minutes as a substitute in his first four Ligue 1 matches.

France Football named Tielemans in their lists of the biggest flops of the first half of the season and the season overall. He scored his first Ligue 1 goal in his 31st game on 2 September 2018, in a 3–2 home loss to Olympique de Marseille.

Leicester City

On 31 January 2019, Tielemans joined Premier League club Leicester City on loan until the end of the season, with Adrien Silva going the other way in a swap deal. On 9 March, Tielemans scored his first goal for the club in a 3–1 win over Fulham.

On 8 July 2019, Tielemans completed a permanent move to Leicester City, on a four-year deal for an estimated fee of £32 million. He scored in a 3–1 home win over Bournemouth on 31 August, but courted controversy with a high challenge on Callum Wilson that escaped punishment even after consultation with the video assistant referee; referees' chief Mike Riley ruled that this was an incorrect decision and Tielemans should have been sent off.

On 15 May 2021, Tielemans scored the only goal of the 2021 FA Cup Final with a long-range strike against Chelsea in the 63rd minute, sealing Leicester's first ever FA Cup title. He was named the man of the match.

International career
In June 2015, Tielemans was called up to the senior Belgium squad for a UEFA Euro 2016 qualifier against Wales. He finally made his senior international debut on 9 November 2016, in a 1–1 friendly away draw to rival Netherlands, replacing Steven Defour in the 82nd minute.

Tielemans was included in manager Roberto Martínez's 23-man squad for the 2018 FIFA World Cup in Russia. He played four matches in the tournament, including the 2–0 win over England in the third-place match.

Tielemans scored his first senior goal for Belgium on 21 March 2019, in a UEFA Euro 2020 qualifying match against Russia. He was called up for the delayed final tournament in May 2021.

Style of play
Tielemans began as a holding midfielder, but was moved by Anderlecht manager Besnik Hasi to a more attacking role, where he scored long-range goals and was compared to Frank Lampard and Axel Witsel. A 2015 profile by Sky Sports noted his versatility as a defensive or attacking midfielder, concluding that his pace, passing and shot power suited the latter role better. Paul Van Himst, a former Anderlecht and Belgium player, noted at the same time that Tielemans had good skills with long passes.

Personal life
Tielemans was born in Sint-Pieters-Leeuw, Flemish Brabant. His father is of Flemish descent and his mother is of Congolese descent. He continued education until the age of 18, combining studies with his professional career. He lives in the Leicestershire village of Quorn with his wife, Mendy, and their two daughters, Melina and Leana.

Career statistics

Club

International

Scores and results list Belgium's goal tally first

Honours
Anderlecht
Belgian Pro League/First Division A: 2013–14, 2016–17
Belgian Super Cup: 2013, 2014

Leicester City
FA Cup: 2020–21
FA Community Shield: 2021

Belgium
FIFA World Cup third place: 2018

Individual

Belgian Young Professional Footballer of the Year: 2013–14, 2014–15
Belgian Talent of the Year: 2014
Best Youngster of the Belgian Pro League: 2014, 2015
Goal.com NxGn: 2016
Belgian Professional Footballer of the Year: 2016–17
UEFA Europa League Squad of the Season: 2016–17
Ebony Shoe: 2017
Belgian Silver Shoe: 2017
Leicester City Player of the Season: 2020–21
Leicester City Players' Player of the Season: 2020–21

References

External links

Profile at the Leicester City F.C. website

1997 births
Living people
People from Sint-Pieters-Leeuw
Footballers from Flemish Brabant
Belgian footballers
Belgium youth international footballers
Belgium under-21 international footballers
Belgium international footballers
Association football midfielders
R.S.C. Anderlecht players
AS Monaco FC players
Leicester City F.C. players
Belgian Pro League players
Ligue 1 players
Premier League players
2018 FIFA World Cup players
UEFA Euro 2020 players
2022 FIFA World Cup players
FA Cup Final players
Belgian expatriate footballers
Expatriate footballers in England
Expatriate footballers in Monaco
Belgian expatriate sportspeople in England
Belgian expatriate sportspeople in Monaco
Black Belgian sportspeople
Flemish sportspeople
Belgian people of Democratic Republic of the Congo descent